Alejandro Rodriguez Jr (born March 21, 1993) is an American professional soccer player who plays for Wa All Stars FC in the Ghana Premier League. He plays as an attacking midfielder, and is also a winger. He is known for his combination of vision, passing, dribbling and technical ability.

Early career 
Rodriguez began his youth career under the guidance of Luis Carlos Perea, who represented Colombia at the 1990 FIFA World Cup and 1994 FIFA World Cup. Rodriguez played soccer at Felix Varela High School, representing the Vipers from 2007 to 2011. He won a National Championship with now head coach of FC Dallas Luchi Gonzalez. Rodriguez helped the Vipers to three State Final four appearances including a national championship in 2008, a state semifinal appearance in 2009, and state finalist in 2011. 

Rodriguez joined the Florida Atlantic University Men's soccer team for one season highlighted by scoring a last minute game winner vs Howard University in the 2011-2012 season.

Senior career 

After his freshman season at Florida Atlantic University, Rodriguez was invited for trials to three Spanish clubs: Real Valladolid, CD Cristo Atletico, and FC Santboia. Rodriguez received two offers from the three clubs but decided to not pursue football in Spain for personal family reasons.

In 2017 Rodriguez joined NPSL club Miami United FC under former Juventus F.C and Japan national football team  assistant coach.

In 2018, Rodriguez signed a contract with the Ghanaian Premier League club and helped his side Wa All Stars FC win its first trophy of the year the Star Times Gala.

Style of play  

Due to Rodriguez's potent attacking talents, he can play a variety of roles as an inverted winger on the left, second striker, or even in a more central position as a main striker. A quick, modern, and right-footed almost ambidextrous forward, with an eye for goal, Rodriguez has been described as a "game changer", and is capable of occupying several offensive positions in or behind the main attacking line, due to his technical skills, ability to drop deep & link-up play between the strikers and midfielders. And he also can score many goals. Rodriguez is an accurate finisher with either foot from both inside and outside the box, and is also technically accurate with his head.

Rodriguez has also been praised for his work-rate, attacking movement, football IQ, and ability to interpret the game, which, combined with his quickness, mobility, stamina, and mesmerizing footwork to boot enables him to be effective against opposition. He has the ability to beat any player and to find the goal from any angle in open play and best at set-pieces.

References

External links
 

1993 births
Living people
American soccer players
Soccer players from Florida
American expatriate soccer players
Association football midfielders
National Premier Soccer League players
Ghana Premier League players
Association football wingers